Buyelekhaya is the debut studio album of Nathi, a South African recording artist. The album singles  "Nomvula" and "Noba Ngumama". It was released on 10 March 2015 under Muthaland Entertainment.

Commercial performance
Upon the release of Buyelekhaya, the album went platinum within six weeks of its release and subsequently triple platinum, receiving positive critical reviews among music critics.

Accolades 
At the South African Afro Music Awards Buyelekhaya was nominated for Best Afro Album.

|-
|2017
|Buyelekhaya
| Best Afro Album
|
|}

Track listing

Certifications

References

2015 albums
Nathi albums